The 1950 Wellington City mayoral election was part of the New Zealand local elections held that same year. In 1950, elections were held for the Mayor of Wellington plus other local government positions including fifteen city councillors. The polling was conducted using the standard first-past-the-post electoral method.

Background
Incumbent Mayor Will Appleton did not seek a third term. He was succeeded by his deputy, Robert Macalister. While Frank Kitts did not win the mayoralty, he and five others were the first Labour candidates elected as councillors since the 'Nathan Incident' in 1941. Labour actually won a majority of the vote, however due to an uneven vote dispersal between their candidates, they failed to win a majority on the council. The Citizens' Association was in disarray following an embarrassing selection row with several incumbents dumped from the ticket standing as an independent ticket. The group consisting of Councillors Malcolm Galloway, Berkeley Dallard, Sandy Pope, Leonard Jacobsen issued a statement saying: "Our stand is a protest against an unwise and grossly unjust selection of a secret clique." All but Dallard were defeated.

Mayoralty results

Councillor results

Notes

References

Mayoral elections in Wellington
1950 elections in New Zealand
Politics of the Wellington Region
1950s in Wellington
November 1950 events in New Zealand